Zhang Min (born 20 June 1993) is a Chinese rower. She competed in the women's coxless pair event at the 2016 Summer Olympics, and placed 7th. She also competed in the women's eight rowing event, where they received a bronze medal.

References

1993 births
Living people
Chinese female rowers
Olympic rowers of China
Rowers at the 2016 Summer Olympics
Asian Games medalists in rowing
Rowers at the 2014 Asian Games
Rowers at the 2018 Asian Games
Asian Games gold medalists for China
Medalists at the 2014 Asian Games
Medalists at the 2018 Asian Games
World Rowing Championships medalists for China
Rowers at the 2020 Summer Olympics
Medalists at the 2020 Summer Olympics
Olympic medalists in rowing
Olympic bronze medalists for China
20th-century Chinese women
21st-century Chinese women